Susanna and the Elders is an oil on canvas painting by Flemish painter Anthony van Dyck, created c. 1621-1622. It is held now in the Alte Pinakothek, in Munich, which acquired it in 1806 from the Düsseldorf Gallery.

References

1622 paintings
Religious paintings by Anthony van Dyck
Collection of the Alte Pinakothek
Nude art
Dyck
Oil on canvas paintings